List of military corps – List of Finnish corps in the Winter War

This is a list of Finnish corps that existed during the Winter War, 1939–1940.
 I Corps – formed February 19, 1940
 II Corps
 III Corps
 IV Corps
 Swedish Volunteer Corps – Svenska Frivilligkåren, arrived in 1940

See also 
 Finnish Army
 List of Finnish corps in the Continuation War
 List of Finnish divisions in the Continuation War
 List of Finnish divisions in the Winter War

References
 
 

Winter War
Military units and formations of Finland in World War II
Finnish corps
Lists of military units and formations of Finland